Dimension W is a Japanese manga series written and illustrated by Yūji Iwahara. It was published in Square Enix's seinen manga magazine Young Gangan from September 2011 to November 2015 and later in Monthly Big Gangan from December 2015 to June 2019. It is licensed in North America by Yen Press. The series follows an auto mechanic hobbyist named Kyouma Mabuchi and a robot girl named Mira Yurizaki, both of whom are "Collectors", bounty hunters tasked with confiscating illegal Coils, dangerous devices which can harness the power of another dimension. As they reluctantly pair up for their mission, they begin to discover the truth behind New Tesla Energy, the multinational supplier of worldwide electrical power. An anime television series aired between January and March 2016.

Synopsis
In the year 2036, a fourth dimensional axis called Dimension W is proven to exist. Cross-dimensional electromagnetic induction devices, known as Coils, were developed to draw out the inexhaustible supply of energy that exists in Dimension W. New Tesla Energy and governments built sixty giant towers around the world in the pattern of a truncated icosahedron to stabilize the energy from Dimension W and supply power to the entire world. This "world system" is nearing its tenth year of operation as the story begins in 2072, and Coils of various sizes provide remote electrical power to everything from cellphones to vehicles and robots. However, dangerous unregistered Coils that do not send information back to New Tesla Energy are being used for illicit purposes. Bounty hunters known as "Collectors" are tasked with confiscating the illegal Coils. Among the Collectors is Kyouma Mabuchi, a Coil-hating loner who one day stumbles upon Mira Yurizaki, the gynoid "daughter" of New Tesla Energy's ailing intellectual founder. When her father disappears while activating an experimental double-ringed Coil, Mira decides to join a reluctant Kyouma and follow the illegal Coils, in the process discovering shady business involving New Tesla Energy.

Characters

Main characters

 Kyouma is a Collector who has largely sworn off all Coil-related technology and has a hobby of restoring old gasoline-powered cars in a junkyard. In the past, Kyouma joined special-ops unit Grendel and took part in a war over competing ideologies within New Tesla Energy to get an experimental prosthetic body for his terminally-ill fiancée, Miyabi. The war was won with the destruction of Easter Island, though Kyouma lost his memories regarding the battle and lost Miyabi in surgery at the same time. To earn a living and help prevent dangerous Coil malfunctions, Kyouma became an independent contractor who hunts down illegal Coils and those who use them. His preferred weapons are large throwing spikes. In the series, he is most often shown driving a white Toyota 2000GT.

Mira is a highly advanced robot who exhibits human mannerisms and insists that she is a normal girl despite her robotic headgear, metallic tail, and other inhuman physical attributes. She is very kind and sweet and is willing to go great lengths to protect those around her even if it means putting herself in harm's way. It is later revealed that her body was originally designed as a prosthetic for Miyabi Azumaya and bears her physical proportions. After hearing news of her "father" death, Mira decides to help Kyouma collect illegal Coils. When Koorogi repairs Mira after a stack of cars falls on her, he adds skin-folds to conceal her Coil. Mira possesses superhuman strength and speed, can override computer systems, use her tail to directly interface with Coils, and detect dimensional distortions.

Illegal Coil Collectors

Mary is a shady club owner who contracts Kyouma to collect illegal Coils for the New Tesla Energy bounty.

Koorogi is a computer expert and engineer employed by Mary. He does not get along with Kyouma, but provides him with information when requested. His name translates as Cricket.

New Tesla Energy
New Tesla Energy is the largest enterprise in the world. Among its known staff members are:

Albert is an old friend of Kyouma who works for New Tesla Energy's Dimensional Administration Bureau (D.A.B.), a paramilitary research group that conducts special tasks such as monitoring potential Coil malfunctions and isolating and covering-up dimensional collapses that occur. Albert and Kyouma met while serving with elite military unit Grendel, of which they are the only two survivors.

Shido is the "physicist of the century" and founder of New Tesla Energy in America. He foresaw the militarization of Coils and proposed the superhuman unit Grendel. Shido disappeared two years ago following the death of his wife and daughter. He uses his robot "daughter," Mira, to seek out illegal Coils to fuel himself and his research. When the company finally tracks him down in the present, Shido uses the last of his strength to unleash his latest experiment that burns out all Coils for several city blocks before vanishing. His current fate is unknown.

Seira is the wife of Shido Yurizaki and a leading prosthetics and robotic developer. She accepted terminally-ill Miyabi Azumaya as a test subject to have her consciousness transferred into a prosthetic body. Still, an unexplained Coil malfunction during the radical surgery cost Miyabi's life and left Seira badly injured. Seira later created Mira from the body intended for Miyabi. Seira and her daughter Ichigo were killed when the D.A.B. broke into their home to seize the results of her research on the day Mira was activated.

Ichigo is the daughter of Shido Yurizaki and Seira Yurizaki.

Claire is the Chief Operations Officer (C.O.O.) of New Tesla Energy Central 47 and Albert's superior. Her granddaughter, Shiora, is one of the four children who play around Kyouma's place.

Shiora is the granddaughter of Claire Skyheart.

Easter Island
A dangerous and forbidden ruin of dimensional collapse, the remote island was once home to New Tesla Energy's Adrastea research facility, which employed:

 / 

Loser is a masked art thief who is popular with the public for broadcasting his heists, that apparently always fail, hence his nickname. In reality, he is after the 'Numbers' Coils alongside his daughter Ellie, seeking to expose the truth of New Tesla Energy's involvement in revenge for a Numbers malfunction that cost him his face, hands, and feet, and the life of his wife. He had once been a top researcher for New Tesla Energy, where he invented energy shields.

Haruka is a former New Tesla Energy scientist and protege of Shido Yurizaki who went mad after New Tesla Energy executives suppressed his promising research while he was on the verge of a breakthrough. He convinces many other scientists to join his cause and conducts illegal Coil research while committing terrorist acts against their corporate masters.

Islero

Salva is the Berber Chief Executive Officer (C.E.O.) of robot manufacturer Islero and C.O.O. of New Tesla Energy Central 60. Known as "The Wind of Africa," he is a considerable celebrity. His childhood dream was to create the world that his adoptive brother Lwai would one day rule. After mistakenly crippling Lwai, Salva has been searching a way to heal his brother.

Lwai is the young heir to the throne of Isla. During a revolt, he unwittingly stepped into the crossfire and was gravely injured by one of Salva's war machines. His broken body is kept on life support while Salva's invention permits Lwai to remotely inhabit robotic bodies.

Lashiti is a faithful retainer of the Tibesti royal family. She once took an assassin's bullet meant for Prince Salva.

Other characters

Ellie is another Collector who is secretly Loser's assistant and daughter. She is good at using drones in the form of animals like pigeons and bats.

Miyabi is Kyouma's deceased fiancee. She was dedicated to her photography hobby, and was diagnosed with a terminal illness that caused her muscles to eat themselves, a muscular dystrophy. During the operation that was meant to save her life, there was an accident with the Coil that was supposed to support her android body and her head was lost in the explosion. This led to Kyouma's hatred for Coils.

Tsubaki is Miyabi's older sister, who manages a kimono shop with assistants Hirose and Ayukawa. She is protective of Kyouma and makes happi coats for him with concealed pockets for his skewers.

Media

Manga
Yūji Iwahara began serializing Dimension W in Square Enix's seinen magazine Young Gangan on 16 September 2011. The manga ceased running in Young Gangan on 20 November 2015, moving to Square Enix's Monthly Big Gangan on 25 December 2015. Yen Press announced their license to the series in October 2015, with plans to publish the first volume in spring or summer 2016. The series has been collected into sixteen tankōbon volumes.

Anime
 and Orange produced an anime television adaptation based on the Dimension W manga. The series is directed by Kanta Kamei with Shōtarō Suga acting as the series organizer and Tokuyuki Matsutake serving as the character designer. Funimation Entertainment serves as part of the anime's committee. The opening theme song, "Genesis", is performed by Stereo Dive Foundation, and the closing theme song, "Contrast", is performed by Fo'xTails. Due to licensing issues, the English broadcast version removes the opening and ending themes.

The series premiered on 10 January 2016, and aired on Tokyo MX, KBS Kyoto, BS11, AT-X, Sun TV, and TV Aichi, and was simulcast worldwide with a broadcast dub by Funimation. Madman Entertainment procured the rights to stream the anime on AnimeLab. On 12 February 2016, it was announced that the anime would be broadcast on Adult Swim's Toonami programming block, replacing Akame ga Kill!, beginning on 28 February 2016. Later it was released on Blu-ray release on 25 March 2016.

On 21 March 2016, a new unaired OVA episode was announced. It was bundled up with the anime's sixth Blu-ray release, which was released on 26 August 2016.

The series was licensed in the UK by Anime Limited, however it was later delisted and cancelled.

References

External links
  at Young Gangan 
  at Monthly Big Gangan 
  
 

3Hz
Action anime and manga
Anime and manga about parallel universes
Anime series based on manga
Artificial intelligence in fiction
Bandai Visual
Cyberpunk anime and manga
Easter Island in fiction
Fiction set in the 21st century
Fictional dimensions
Fictional power sources
Fictional special forces personnel
Funimation
Gangan Comics manga
Japan in fiction
Military science fiction
Orange (animation studio)
Seinen manga
Square Enix franchises
Tokyo MX original programming
Toonami
Yen Press titles